Novomaximovsky is a rural locality (a khutor) and the administrative center of Novomaximovskoye Rural Settlement, Surovikinsky District, Volgograd Oblast, Russia. The population was 1,371 as of 2010. There are 18 streets.

Geography 
Novomaximovsky is located on the bank of the Tsimlyansk Reservoir, 52 km southeast of Surovikino (the district's administrative centre) by road. Verkhnechirsky is the nearest rural locality.

References 

Rural localities in Surovikinsky District